Salome with the Head of John the Baptist (Madrid), c. 1609, is a painting by the Italian master Caravaggio in the Palacio Real, Madrid.

The early Caravaggio biographer Giovanni Bellori, writing in 1672, records the artist sending a Salome with the Head of John the Baptist from Naples to the Grand Master of the Knights of Malta, Fra Alof de Wignacourt, in the hope of regaining favour after having been expelled from the Order in 1608. It seems likely that this is the work, according to Caravaggio scholar John Gash. Gash also notes that the executioner, looking down at the severed head, helps transform the painting "from a provocative spectacle into a profound meditation on death and human malevolence."

See also
Salome with the Head of John the Baptist (Caravaggio), London
List of paintings by Caravaggio

Further reading

References

External links

1600s paintings
Paintings by Caravaggio
Paintings about death
Paintings depicting Salome
Paintings depicting John the Baptist
Christian art about death
Royal Palace of Madrid
Spanish royal collection